Stallings is a surname. Notable people with this surname include:

 A. E. Stallings (born 1968),  American poet and translator
 Ben Stallings (born 1987), American professional football fullback 
 Bill Stallings (1962–2010), American professional soccer forward
 Dennis Stallings (born 1974), American former professional football player
 Don Stallings (born 1938), American professional football defensive lineman
 Earl Stallings (1916–2006), American Baptist minister and activist in the Civil Rights Movement
 Felix Stallings Jr. (born 1971), American DJ and record producer 
 Fran Stallings (born 1943), American storyteller 
 Gene Stallings (born 1935), former American college and professional football coach
 George Stallings (1867–1929), American baseball player and manager
 George Augustus Stallings Jr. (born 1948), American priest
 George B. Stallings Jr. (1918–2018), American politician 
 Henry Stallings II (1950–2015), American politician
 Jack Stallings (1931–2018), American college baseball coach
 Jacob Stallings (born 1989), American professional baseball catcher, son of Kevin Stallings 
 Jami Stallings (born ca. 1987), Miss Indiana USA 2007
 Jane Stallings (1929–2016), American academic
 Jesse F. Stallings (1856–1928), American politician
 Jim Stallings, American musician
 John R. Stallings (1935–2008), American mathematician
 Kay Wilson Stallings, American television executive and producer
 Kevin Stallings (born 1960), former American college basketball coach, father of Jacob Stallings
 Larry Stallings (born 1941), American former professional football player
 Laurence Stallings (1894–1968), American writer
 Louise Stallings (1890–1966), American soprano, sister of Udell H. Stallings
 Mary Stallings (born 1939), American jazz vocalist
 Mary Stallings Coleman (1914–2001), Michigan Supreme Court justice
 Patricia Stallings (born 1964 or 1965), American wrongfully convicted of murder
 Ramondo Stallings (born 1971), American professional football player
 Raymond Stallings McLain (1890–1954), Lieutenant General, United States Army 
 Richard H. Stallings (born 1940), American politician
 Robert S. Stallings (born 1927), American politician
 Ron Stallings (born 1983), American mixed martial artist
 Scott Stallings (born 1985), American professional golfer
 Sonny Stallings (born 1947), American politician
 Tre' Stallings (born 1983), American former professional football player
 Udell H. Stallings (1899–1966), American college football and baseball player and coah, brother of Louise Stallings 
 Vernon Stallings (1891–1963), American animation director and writer
 William Stallings, American author who writes on computers and technology
 William S. Stallings, see Bill Stallings

See also
Stalling (surname)